Rita Roland (born Rita Rosenstein) was a prolific German-born film editor known for her work on German and American films like Six Pack, The New Kids, and Good Luck, Miss Wyckoff.

Biography 
Rita Rosenstein was born in Germany to Ernst Rosenstein and Elsa Landsberger. She began her career as a film editor back in her native country before World War II. She fled Germany during the Holocaust, moving to Hollywood, where she cut dozens of films for MGM before she died in 1998. She was survived by her husband, Dutch writer-director Henry Martin.

Selected filmography 

 The New Kids (1985)
 Six Pack (1982)
 Fort Apache the Bronx (1981)
 Resurrection (1980)
 Good Luck, Miss Wyckoff (1979)
 The Betsy (1978)
 Once Is Not Enough (1975)
 To Find a Man (1972)
 Move (1970)
 Justine (1969)
 More (1969)
 The Split (1968)
 Where Were You When the Lights Went Out? (1968)
 Don't Make Waves (1967)
 Penelope (1966)
 Spinout (1966)
 The Singing Nun (1966)
 A Patch of Blue (1965)
 Girl Happy (1965)
 Honeymoon Hotel (1964)
 Ada (1961)
 Crowded Paradise (1956)
 Wilton's Zoo (1939)
 I Want to Live with Letizia (1938)

References

External links

German film editors
American women film editors
1914 births
1998 deaths
German emigrants to the United States
Film people from Berlin
American film editors
German women film editors